The Judiciary Act 1903 (Cth) is an Act of the Parliament of Australia that regulates the structure of the Australian judicial system and confers jurisdiction on Australian federal courts. It is one of the oldest pieces of Australian federal legislation and has been amended over 70 times.

Amongst other things, the Act regulates the exercise of the jurisdiction of the High Court of Australia, confers jurisdiction on the Federal Court of Australia, provides for the right of barristers and solicitors to practice in federal courts, and establishes the Australian Government Solicitor.

The Act
Section 78B of the Act requires Australian courts to ensure that the parties have given notice to the attorneys-general of Australia and of each state before proceeding with any case involving a "matter arising under the Constitution." Each of these governments may then intervene in the case under section 78A of the Act.

See also
 Australia Act 1986

External links
Judiciary Act 1903
ALRC Report 92: A Review of the Judiciary Act 1903 and Related Legislation – Australian Law Reform Commission Review (July 2001)

References 

Acts of the Parliament of Australia
1903 in Australian law
Act
Judiciary of Australia